William Oliver (31 March 1899 - 18 November 1973) was an Irish shopkeeper and politician. He was the Member of the Northern Ireland Parliament (MP) for Belfast Dock for the Ulster Unionist Party from 1958 to 1962. Spouse: Lilian Kate Wainwright (31 December 1900 - June 1964) - issue Kathleen, William, Diane, Rosemary & Terence.

References

1899 births
1973 deaths
Members of the House of Commons of Northern Ireland 1958–1962
Ulster Unionist Party members of the House of Commons of Northern Ireland
Members of the House of Commons of Northern Ireland for Belfast constituencies